Scott Chaskey is an American organic farmer and author.

Books
Seedtime On the History, Husbandry, Politics, and Promise of Seeds (Rodale, 2014)
This Common Ground Seasons on an Organic Farm (Viking, 2005)
Stars are Suns (Stoneman Press, 1993)

References

External links
Official website

Organic farmers
American non-fiction writers
Living people
Year of birth missing (living people)